Falkenberg is a surname. Notable people with the surname include:

 Anna Falkenberg (born 1996), Faroese politician
 Carl Frederick Falkenberg, Canadian First World War flying ace
 Christopher Falkenberg, former Special Agent of the United States Secret Service
 Bob Falkenberg, retired Canadian professional ice hockey defenceman
 Cy Falkenberg, former American pitcher in Major League Baseball 
 Dietmar Falkenberg, East German bobsledder
 Eckhard D. Falkenberg, German computer scientist
 Hendrick Jacobs Falkenberg, early American settler along the Delaware River
 Johan Falkenberg, Norwegian olympic fencer
 Johannes Falkenberg, Norwegian social anthropologist
 Kenneth Falkenberg, Danish football goalkeeper
 Kim Falkenberg, German footballer
 Lisa Falkenberg, American journalist
 Lise Lyng Falkenberg, Danish writer
 Louise Falkenberg, Swedish philanthropist
 Maria Falkenberg, Swedish biochemist
 Otto Falkenberg, Norwegian sailor
 Paul Falkenberg, German botanist

Falckenberg is a variant spelling of the same surname. Notable people with the surname include:
 Otto Falckenberg (1873–1947), German theatre director, manager and writer

Fictional characters:
 John Christian Falkenberg, character in the CoDominium series

German-language surnames
Swedish noble families

de:Falckenberg